Ammu is a 1965 Indian Malayalam-language film, directed by N. N. Pisharady and produced by M. Kesavan. The film stars Ambika in the eponymous role along with Sathyan, Madhu, Sukumari and Adoor Bhasi in pivotal roles. It marked actress Sujatha Menon’s debut film as an actress in the industry.

Plot

Cast 

Sathyan as Shekharan
Madhu as Bhasi
Sukumari as Saro
Adoor Bhasi as Achummaavan
Omanakuttan
P. K. Saraswathi as Kalyaniyamma
Prem Nawas as Appu
Ambika as Ammu
Baby Saru as Thankam
Indira Thampi as Ammini
Kaduvakulam Antony as Anthonimaappila
Kedamangalam Ali
Master Ajit Kumar
Premji as Shankunni Nair
Sujatha as Sharadha

Soundtrack 
The music was composed by M. S. Baburaj and the lyrics were written by Yusufali Kechery.

References

External links 
 

1965 films
1960s Malayalam-language films